State Road 188 (NM 188) is a  paved, four-lane state highway in Doña Ana County in the U.S. state of New Mexico. NM 188's southern terminus is at the road's junction with an exit ramp of Interstate 10 (I-10) and U.S. Route 180 (US 180) in Las Cruces, on the western edge of NMSU campus. The road's northern terminus is in Las Cruces at the road's junction with US 70 and the southern terminus of NM 185. NM 188 is also known as South Valley Drive.

Route description
The highway lies entirely within the city of Las Cruces limits, and travels through commercial and residential areas of the city. The highway begins at the end of the exit ramp of I-10 from where the ramp becomes a two-lane road. The road then turns farther north, crossing NM 28, and arrives at its northeastern terminus at the intersection with US 70.

History
NM 188 together with NM 185 and NM 187 once were parts of US 85. The old US 85 was created by Congress in 1925, and was built in late 1920s-early 1930s. US 85 was a major thoroughfare in the state of New Mexico, connecting southern and northern parts of the state. With the construction of I-25 in 1956, US 85 was relegated to a secondary highway role. According to available maps, sometime between 1958 and 1962, a US 85 bypass road was constructed through the southwestern side of Las Cruces. In 1988, the New Mexico Department of Transportation (NMDOT) went through a radical road renumbering program, and US 85 was eliminated from the state designation, instead the original length of the highway was broken into smaller segments. A short spur connecting I-10 to US 70 over the stretch of former US 85 Bypass was designated as NM 188.

Major intersections

See also

References

External links

188
Transportation in Doña Ana County, New Mexico
Las Cruces, New Mexico
U.S. Route 85